Phitthaya Sathian Bridge is a historic bridge in the Bangkok's Talat Noi sub-district, Samphanthawong district. It's considered as another steel bridge of Bangkok counterpart with the Damrong Sathit Bridge, popularly known as Saphan Lek, which site in the area of Khlong Thom. Phitthaya Sathian Bridge is the bridge on Charoen Krung road across Khlong Phadung Krung Kasem  and formed a border of Samphanthawong with Bang Rak's Maha Phruettharam and Bang Rak sub-districts.

When the new construction in the reign of King Mongkut (Rama IV), the structure was steel and can be separated from each other for the boat pass similar to lifting bridge. Hence the named "Saphan Lek" in Thai, and was often called "Saphan Lek Lang" (สะพานเหล็กล่าง; lit: lower steel bridge), while Damrong Sathit Bridge was called "Saphan Lek Bon" (สะพานเหล็กบน; upper steel bridge). Later during the reign of King Chulalongkorn (Rama V) in 1899 it was restored and completed in 1900 includes received the official name in honour of Prince Sonabandit (พระเจ้าบรมวงศ์เธอ พระองค์เจ้าโสณบัณฑิต กรมขุนพิทยลาภพฤฒิธาดา), the owner of palace in the vicinity named Wang Talat Noi (วังตลาดน้อย; Talat Noi Palace).

In the reign of King Vajiravudh (Rama VI), it has been restored again and still the condition as today. The bridge is reinforced cement built with beautiful Venetian Gothic architecture. The lower beam is curved, this bridge is decorated with exquisite decoration especially balustrades, all eight lampposts, as well as the lion head sculptures at the end. And is now a recognised ancient monument since 1975 by the Fine Arts Department along with Damrong Sathit Bridge.

See also
Damrong Sathit Bridge

References

Samphanthawong district
Bang Rak district
Bridges in Bangkok
Registered ancient monuments in Bangkok